Alone is a 1957 studio album by Judy Garland, arranged by Gordon Jenkins.

Track listing

Personnel

Performance 
 Judy Garland - vocals
 Gordon Jenkins - conductor, arranger

References 

1957 albums
Judy Garland albums
Albums produced by Voyle Gilmore
Capitol Records albums
Albums arranged by Gordon Jenkins
Albums conducted by Gordon Jenkins